This is a list of rural localities in Khabarovsk Krai. Khabarovsk Krai is a federal subject (a krai) of Russia. It is geographically located in the Far East region of the country and is a part of the Far Eastern Federal District. The administrative center of the krai is the city of Khabarovsk, which is home to roughly half of the krai's population and the second largest city in the Russian Far East (after Vladivostok). Khabarovsk Krai is the fourth-largest federal subject by area, with a population of 1,343,869 as of the (2010 Census).

Amursky District 
Rural localities in Amursky District:

 147 km

Ayano-Maysky District 
Rural localities in Ayano-Maysky District:

 Aldoma
 Ayan

Imeni Lazo District 
Rural localities in Imeni Lazo District:

 34 kilometr
 43 kilometr
 52 kilometr

Imeni Poliny Osipenko District 
Rural localities in Imeni Poliny Osipenko District:

 Imeni Poliny Osipenko

Khabarovsky District 
Rural localities in Khabarovsky District:

 18 km
 24 km
 Sikachi-Alyan
 Vyatskoye

Komsomolsky District, Khabarovsk Krai 
Rural localities in Komsomolsky District, Khabarovsk Krai:

 Chyorny Mys
 Selikhino

Nanaysky District 
Rural localities in Nanaysky District:

 Troitskoye

Tuguro-Chumikansky District 
Rural localities in Tuguro-Chumikansky District:

 Chumikan

Ulchsky District 
Rural localities in Ulchsky District:

 Bogorodskoye
 Tyr

Verkhnebureinsky District 
Rural localities in Verkhnebureinsky District:

 Chekunda

Vyazemsky District, Khabarovsk Krai 
Rural localities in Vyazemsky District, Khabarovsk Krai:

 Avan

See also 
 
 Lists of rural localities in Russia

References 

Khabarovsk Krai